Margaret Smith (born 18 February 1961) is a Scottish Liberal Democrat politician. She is the former Member of the Scottish Parliament (MSP) for the Edinburgh West constituency, a seat she held from 1999 Scottish Parliament election until 2011 Scottish Parliament election. She was the Scottish Liberal Democrats Spokesperson for Education. She was the first openly lesbian MSP.

At the 2011 election, she lost her seat to the Scottish National Party's Colin Keir who won with a majority of 2,689. As the Liberal Democrats failed to win any seats on the Lothian regional list, Smith was not returned as an MSP. Her constituency seat was however won back in 2016 by the Liberal Democrats' Alex Cole-Hamilton.

References

External links
 
Margaret Smith profile at the site of Scottish Liberal Democrats

1961 births
Living people
Liberal Democrat MSPs
Lesbian politicians
Female members of the Scottish Parliament
Members of the Scottish Parliament 1999–2003
Members of the Scottish Parliament 2003–2007
Members of the Scottish Parliament 2007–2011
Members of the Scottish Parliament for Edinburgh constituencies
20th-century Scottish women politicians
LGBT members of the Scottish Parliament